Ghosthunters: On Icy Trails is a 2015 German-Austrian-Irish comedy film starring Anke Engelke, Milo Parker and Bastian Pastewka as the voice of Hugo.  It is based on the novel Ghosthunters and the Incredibly Revolting Ghost! By Cornelia Funke.

Plot

Cast
Anke Engelke as Hetty Cumminseed
Milo Parker as Tom Thompson
Christian Tramitz as Gregory Smith
Karoline Herfurth as Hopkins
Christian Ulmen as Phil Thompson
Julia Koschitz as Patricia Thompson
Bastian Pastewka as Hugo (voice)

Reception
The film has a 17% rating on Rotten Tomatoes.  Tara Brady of The Irish Times gave it two stars out of five.  Mike McCahill of The Guardian also gave the film two stars out of five.

References

External links
 
 

2015 films
2010s ghost films
2010s fantasy comedy films
German comedy films
German fantasy films
German children's films
Austrian comedy films
Austrian children's films
Irish comedy films
Irish fantasy films
2010s English-language films
English-language German films
English-language Austrian films
English-language Irish films
2010s German-language films
2010s children's fantasy films
Films based on German novels
Films with live action and animation
Warner Bros. films
2010s children's films
2015 comedy films
2010s German films